Goose Boy is a 1950 Hungarian comedy film directed by based on the epic poem by Mihály Fazekas.

Cast 
 Imre Soós - Ludas Matyi
 Erzsi Pártos - Anyó, Matyis Mutter
 Teri Horváth - Piros
 György Solthy - Döbrögy
 Éva Ruttkai - Gyöngyi - Döbrögy lánya
 Manyi Kiss - Paméla, francia nevelõnõ
 Artúr Somlay - Mohos professzor
 István Bozóky - Nyegriczky Bálint
 János Görbe - Gergely
 Miklós Szakáts - Bogáncs
 Samu Balázs - Szinész

References

External links 

1950 comedy films
1950 films
Hungarian comedy films